Events from the year 1639 in Ireland.

Incumbent
Monarch: Charles I

Events
Richard Nugent, 1st Earl of Westmeath, builds Clonyn Castle overlooking Delvin, County Westmeath.
Theobald Stapleton publishes (in Brussels) a catechism in the Early Modern Irish language,  or, in Irish, . It is the first Roman Catholic book in which the Irish language is printed in the antiqua typeface and the first notable attempt to simplify Irish orthography.

Arts and literature
Autumn – James Shirley's play Saint Patrick for Ireland opens at the Werburgh Street Theatre in Dublin.

Births

Deaths
March 8 – Edward King, Church of Ireland Bishop of Elphin
July 26 – Henry O'Brien, 5th Earl of Thomond, peer (b. 1588)
Approximate date – Muircheartach Óg Ó Cíonga, writer and priest (b. c.1562)

 
Years of the 17th century in Ireland